WTCQ (97.7 FM, "98Q") is a radio station broadcasting a classic hits format. It is licensed to Vidalia, Georgia, United States. The station is currently owned by Dennis Jones, through licensee RadioJones, LLC, and features programming from ABC Radio and Jones Radio Network.

History 
The station signed on the air on March 5, 1969. The station was first owned locally by the Vidalia Broadcasting Company. Throughout the 1980s and early 1990s, it was under an adult contemporary format.

References

External links

TCQ